Buffalo is a city in Johnson County, Wyoming, United States. The city is located almost equidistant between Yellowstone Park and Mount Rushmore. The population was 4,415 at the 2020 census, down from 4,585 at the 2010 census. It is the county seat of Johnson County. The city has experienced an economic boom due to methane production from the coal bed methane extraction method used in the Powder River Basin and surrounding areas. However, with the decline of methane production, Buffalo's population has stabilized since the 2010 Census. Even though energy is a vital part of its economy, agriculture, tourism, and recreation are three other major components. Buffalo is at the foot of the Bighorn Mountains.

Demographics

2010 census
As of the census of 2010, there were 4,585 people, 2,080 households, and 1,198 families living in the city. The racial makeup of the city was 95.5% White, 0.3% African American, 1.6% Native American, 0.7% Asian, 0.8% from other races, and 1.2% from two or more races. Hispanic or Latino of any race were 3.5% of the population.

There were 2,080 households, of which 26.8% had children under the age of 18 living with them, 45.4% were married couples living together, 8.7% had a female householder with no husband present, 3.6% had a male householder with no wife present, and 42.4% were non-families. 37.8% of all households were made up of individuals, and 15.3% had someone living alone who was 65 years of age or older. The average household size was 2.17 and the average family size was 2.88.

The median age in the city was 42.2 years. 23% of residents were under the age of 18; 6.6% were between the ages of 18 and 24; 23.4% were from 25 to 44; 27.7% were from 45 to 64; and 19.4% were 65 years of age or older. The gender makeup of the city was 50.1% male and 49.9% female.

2000 census
As of the census of 2000, there were 3,900 people, 1,718 households, and 1,042 families living in the city. The population density was 1,104.8 people per square mile (426.6/km2). There were 1,842 housing units at an average density of 521.8 per square mile (201.5/km2). The racial makeup of the city was 96.46% White, 0.10% African American, 0.82% Native American, 0.05% Asian, 0.54% from other races, and 2.03% from two or more races. Hispanic or Latino of any race were 1.82% of the population.

There were 1,718 households, out of which 26.1% had children under the age of 18 living with them, 48.8% were married couples living together, 8.4% had a female householder with no husband present, and 39.3% were non-families. 35.3% of all households were made up of individuals, and 16.1% had someone living alone who was 65 years of age or older. The average household size was 2.21 and the average family size was 2.88.

In the city, the population was spread out, with 23.1% under the age of 18, 5.6% from 18 to 24, 22.6% from 25 to 44, 27.1% from 45 to 64, and 21.5% who were 65 years of age or older. The median age was 44 years. For every 100 females, there were 93.5 males. For every 100 females age 18 and over, there were 89.4 males.

The median income for a household in the city was $29,392, and the median income for a family was $40,683. Males had a median income of $28,716 versus $19,688 for females. The per capita income for the city was $19,054. About 6.7% of families and 10.4% of the population were below the poverty line, including 7.0% of those under age 18 and 12.4% of those age 65 or over.

Government and infrastructure
The Wyoming Department of Health Veteran's Home of Wyoming, an assisted living facility for veterans and their dependents, is located in Buffalo. The facility was operated by the Wyoming Board of Charities and Reform until that agency was dissolved as a result of a state constitutional amendment passed in November 1990. Buffalo also has an airport named Johnson County Airport/KBYG.

Education
Public education in the city of Buffalo is provided by Johnson County School District #1. Schools serving the city include Meadowlark Elementary School (grades K-2) Cloud Peak Elementary School (grades 3–5), Clear Creek Middle School (grades 6–8), and Buffalo High School (grades 9–12). Buffalo High School was in the national news spot light after the (former) head football coach, distributed an offensive "hurt feelings report" in November 2011. This attention brought several heated school board meetings and eventually lead to the resignation of Lynch as the head football coach.

Buffalo has a public library, the Johnson County Library.

Area media

Newspapers
The Mini Publications Center is a Wyoming non-profit and registered 501 (c)(3) organization, dedicated to helping regional community and small businesses grow and prosper through free and low cost community services, using both print and online media journalism focused on the needs of rural communities. MPC runs an internet café, has a local gallery in the café, and is starting its 14th year publishing a free local community newspaper, The Mini, published twice a week. An online version, BigHornMountainExpress.com, expands to include the whole Big Horn Mountains region of north central Wyoming. MPC runs the BigHornMountainExpress.com as a rural community news site, as well as an educational website, instructing how to write about the arts, their community and small business advice. The MPC is also working to create a community learning or community college course certification in running a rural community news service and for developing citizen journalists of all ages and backgrounds. They adhere to the best principles of citizen journalism for rural communities.

The Buffalo Bulletin has served as the newspaper of record in Johnson County since 1884. The paper is published once a week on Thursdays. It has been family owned and operated for three generations. Robb Hicks, the current owner and publisher of the paper, purchased the Bulletin from his father Jim Hicks in 1996. Hicks owns newspapers across Wyoming, Montana, South Dakota, Nebraska, Colorado, Idaho and Washington.

Radio
 KBBS AM 1450   "Classic Country"
 KBUW FM 90.5 Wyoming Public Radio
 KHRW FM 92.7   "The Eagle"
 KLGT FM 96.5   "KIX 96.5"
 KZZS FM 98.3   "The Peak"
 "307 Net Radio"

Geography

Transportation 
Buffalo is located near the northern terminus of Interstate 25, where it joins with Interstate 90.

The city is served by a general aviation airfield, the Johnson County Airport (Wyoming), which does not have scheduled passenger air service.

Airports in the region which do have airline service include:

 Sheridan (SHR) - Approx. 1/2-hour drive to Buffalo
 Gillette (GCC) - Approx. 1-hour drive to Buffalo
 Casper (CPR) - Approx. 1.5-hour drive to Buffalo
 Billings (BIL) - Apprx. 2+hours drive to Buffalo

Public Transport
Buffalo and its surroundings are served by the Buffalo Area Transit System which is a paratransit service operated by the Buffalo Senior Center Buffalo Area Transit System also offers trips to Sheridan and Casper.

Climate

According to the Köppen Climate Classification system, Buffalo has a cold semi-arid climate, abbreviated "BSk" on climate maps.

Notable people

Mark Gordon (born 1957), businessman, rancher from Buffalo and Wyoming governor
Frank E. Lucas (1876–1948), Governor of Wyoming
Mathew Pitsch (born 1963), Republican member of the Arkansas House of Representatives for Fort Smith since 2015; Buffalo native
Chris Prosinski (born 1987), safety for the Chicago Bears; previously played for the Jacksonville Jaguars and Philadelphia Eagles
Constantine Scollen (1841–1902), missionary, resident priest from 1893 to 1894
Joe Tiller (1942–2017), head football coach Wyoming (six years) and Purdue (nine years), winningest coach ever at Purdue

See also

Fort McKinney (Wyoming)
List of municipalities in Wyoming
Longmire (TV series)
Endangered Species (1982 film)

References

External links

 Chamber of Commerce website
 

 
Cities in Wyoming
Cities in Johnson County, Wyoming
County seats in Wyoming